Mabel Bardine Myers Farnsworth (October 25, 1878 - October 20, 1948), was an American vaudeville performer and Hollywood actress. In 1908 she was accused of plagiarizing the sketch, The Chorus Lady, from Rose Stahl. She was a leading woman in Essanay Studios and Fox Film.

Biography
She was born as Mabel Bardine Myers on October 25, 1878 in Colorado.

In 1908 she was accused of plagiarizing the sketch, The Chorus Lady, from Rose Stahl.

She died on October 20, 1948 in Los Angeles, California. She was buried in Forest Lawn Memorial Park in Glendale, California.

Filmography
The Splendid Lie (1920)
 The Place of Honeymoons (1920)
Winning Her Way (1919) by Margaret Mayo for the American Red Cross
Rough and Ready (1918)
Beyond the Law (1918)
Mother Love and the Law (1917)

Vaudeville playlets
An Experiment in Humor (1910)
Nell of the Halls (1909)
Thou Shall Not Kill (1905), produced by Federick Schwartz

External links

References

1878 births
1948 deaths
Vaudeville performers
Actresses from Colorado
American film actresses
Place of birth missing